Wilhelm Batz (21 May 1916 – 11 September 1988) was a German  Luftwaffe fighter ace during World War II. A flying ace or fighter ace is a military aviator credited with shooting down five or more enemy aircraft during aerial combat. Batz flew 445 combat missions and claimed 237 enemy aircraft shot down. 234 of these victories were achieved over the Eastern Front, including at least 46 Ilyushin Il-2 ground-attack aircraft, but he did claim three victories, including one four-engine bomber against the United States Army Air Forces (USAAF) over the Ploieşti oil fields. Batz was a recipient of the Knight's Cross of the Iron Cross with Oak Leaves and Swords.

Early life and career
Batz was born on 21 May 1916 in Bamberg, at the time in the Kingdom of Bavaria. He was the son of a Beamter, a civil servant. After Batz graduated with his Abitur (university-preparatory high school diploma), for four years, he volunteered military service in the Luftwaffe on 1 November 1935. Batz grew up between the World Wars, with the Red Baron as his ideal of a fighter pilot.

World War II
Batz joined the Luftwaffe in 1935 and trained as a fighter pilot, becoming an instructor in 1937 at the flying school at Kaufbeuren and the fighter pilot school at Bad Aibling. Promoted Leutnant in November 1940, his applications for combat assignment were continually rejected. With some 5,000 flying hours, Batz was finally transferred to 2./Ergänzungs-Jagdgruppe Ost in December 1942. Batz was then transferred to II./Jagdgeschwader 52 (JG 52). On 11 March 1943, Batz claimed his first victory, an Ilyushin Il-2 ground-attack aircraft, while flying a mission over the Strait of Kerch. He was appointed Staffelkapitän (Squadron Leader) of 5./JG 52 on 9 May 1943. He succeeded Leutnant Josef Zwernemann who temporarily led the Staffel after its former commander, Leutnant Helmut Haberda had been killed in action. By September, he had claimed 20 victories. Batz claimed his 75th aerial victory on 7 December, after shooting down 25 the previous week, for which he received leave until February 1944. He scored number 76 on 10 February, then went on a spree adding 131 victories in the next 6 and a half months. He got the Knight's Cross of the Iron Cross in March, followed by his 100th victory two days later. He was the 67th Luftwaffe pilot to achieve the century mark.

Group commander and surrender

Batz was promoted to Hauptmann (captain) on 1 April 1944. The narrow land bridge to the Crimean peninsula, held by the German 17th Army, came under attack from Soviet forces on 7 April, leading to the capture of Odessa on 10 April during the Dnieper–Carpathian Offensive. In these battles, Batz claimed six aerial victories on 8 April, five on 10 April, reaching his 120th victory on 13 April. One day later, II. Gruppe (2nd group) moved to an airfield at Cape Chersonez located at the Sevastopol Bay. That morning, the airfield came under aerial attack and bomb splinters injured Batz. Although his injuries were minor, he was grounded for two weeks and banned by the doctor from flying operationally. During his convalescence, Batz succeeded Günther Rall as Gruppenkommandeur (group commander) of III. Gruppe (3rd group) of JG 52 on 19 April 1944.

In June, his unit was moved to defend Romanian targets against the American 15th Air Force. Batz claimed two P-51 Mustang fighter aircraft and a B-24 Liberator bomber at this time. Batz was awarded the Knight's Cross of the Iron Cross with Oak Leaves on 20 July for 188 victories, his 200th was achieved on 17 August 1944. The award was presented by Adolf Hitler at the Führerhauptquartier (Führer Headquarters) at Rastenburg on 25 August 1944. Two other Luftwaffe officers were presented with the Oak Leaves that day by Hitler, the night-fighter pilot Hauptmann (Captain) Heinz Strüning and the officer of anti-aircraft warfare, Major (Major) Herbert Lamprecht.

By the end of 1944, Batz had shot down 224 enemy aircraft. On 1 February 1945, Batz was transferred to take command of II. Gruppe of JG 52, based in Hungary. He succeeded Hauptmann Erich Hartmann who had temporarily led the Gruppe after its former commander Major Gerhard Barkhorn had been transferred. Command of III. Gruppe was then passed on to Major Adolf Borchers. Batz was awarded the Knight's Cross of the Iron Cross with Oak Leaves and Swords on 21 April 1945. The bestowal of the Swords to his Knight's Cross cannot be verified via the records held in the German Federal Archives. Batz presented evidence of the conferment which was confirmed by the Gemeinschaft der Jagdflieger (Association of German Armed Forces Airmen).

On 4 May 1945, II. Gruppe moved to Zeltweg Air Base but did not fly combat missions from this airfield. On 8 May, General der Flieger Paul Deichmann, the commanding officer of Luftwaffenkommando 4, ordered the cease-fire by 12:00. To avoid capture by Soviet forces, Batz conferred with Deichmann and was ordered to fly his aircraft to Munich, landing at Unterbiberg where they surrendered to US forces, becoming prisoners of war. He and II. Gruppe personnel were then taken to Fürstenfeldbruck where most of the men were released in June 1945. Batz was taken to Bad Aibling where the ground personnel had surrendered and released shortly after.

Later life
Following World War II, Batz applied for service in the German Air Force of the Bundeswehr in 1955, joining in 1956 holding the rank of Major. Following flight training in the United States, he was commanded to a training squadron of Flugzeugführerschule "S", a pilot training school, in Landsberg. He later commanded this training facility for nine months in 1961. Batz was then appointed Geschwaderkommodore (wing commander) of Lufttransportgeschwader 63 (LTG 63–Air Transport Wing 63) stationed at the Hohn Air Base in Schleswig-Holstein. He commanded this wing from 1961 to 1964, surrendering command to Horst Rudat. Promoted to Oberstleutnant (lieutenant colonel), Batz then served as a staff officer with Lufttransportkommando (Air Force Transport Command) in Köln-Wahn and retired on 30 September 1972.
Batz died on 11 September 1988 in a hospital Ebern in Unterfranken. He was buried on the cemetery in Quettingen, a borough of Leverkusen-Opladen.

Summary of career

Aerial victory claims
According to US historian David T. Zabecki, Batz was credited with 237 aerial victories. According to Spick, Batz was credited with 237 aerial victories claimed in 445 combat missions. Of this figure, 232 aerial victories were claimed on the Eastern Front and five over the Western Allies, including two four-engine bombers. Mathews and Foreman, authors of Luftwaffe Aces — Biographies and Victory Claims, researched the German Federal Archives and found records for 233 confirmed and eight unconfirmed aerial victories, numerically ranging from 1 to 233, omitting the 223rd claim. All these victories were claimed on the Eastern Front.

Victory claims were logged to a map-reference (PQ = Planquadrat), for example "PQ 34 Ost 85131". These sectors were then subdivided into 36 smaller units to give a location area 3 × 4 km in size.

Awards
 Wound Badge in Silver
 Honor Goblet of the Luftwaffe on 13 December 1943 as Oberleutnant and pilot
 Front Flying Clasp of the Luftwaffe in Gold with Pennant "400"
 Combined Pilots-Observation Badge
 German Cross in Gold on 28 January 1944 as Oberleutnant in the II./Jagdgeschwader 52.
 Iron Cross (1939)
 2nd Class (24 April 1943)
 1st Class (3 July 1943)
 Knight's Cross of the Iron Cross with Oak Leaves and Swords
 Knight's Cross on 26 March 1944 as Oberleutnant (war officer) and Staffelkapitän of the 5./Jagdgeschwader 52
 526th Oak Leaves on 20 July 1944 as Hauptmann and Gruppenkommandeur of the III./Jagdgeschwader 52
 (145th) Swords on 21 April 1945 as Major and Gruppenkommandeur of the II./Jagdgeschwader 52.

Dates of rank

Notes

References

Citations

Bibliography

 
 
 
 
 
 
 
 
 
 
 
 
 
 
 
 
 
 
 

1916 births
1988 deaths
People from Bamberg
People from the Kingdom of Bavaria
Luftwaffe pilots
German World War II flying aces
Recipients of the Gold German Cross
Recipients of the Knight's Cross of the Iron Cross with Oak Leaves and Swords
German prisoners of war in World War II held by the United States
German Air Force pilots
Military personnel from Bavaria